The Swimmers is a 2022 biographical sports drama film directed by Sally El Hosaini from a screenplay that she co-wrote with Jack Thorne. The film stars real-life sisters Nathalie Issa and Manal Issa, Ahmed Malek, Matthias Schweighöfer, Ali Suliman, Kinda Alloush, James Krishna Floyd and Elmi Rashid Elmi. 

The Swimmers had its world premiere at the 2022 Toronto International Film Festival on September 8, 2022, and was released in select cinemas on November 11, 2022. It was shown at the evening gala of the Marrakesh International Film Festival on November 18, 2022, before its streaming release on November 23, 2022, by Netflix.

Premise
The plot follows the life story of teenage Syrian refugees Yusra Mardini and her sister Sarah Mardini, who swam alongside a sinking dinghy of refugees to lighten it, and eventually help 18 refugees to reach safety across the Aegean Sea while being smuggled from İzmir towards Lesbos. Subsequent struggles as refugees are vividly depicted, but Yusra Mardini's swimming career sees her reaching the Rio 2016 Olympics as a member of the Refugee Olympic Team.

The final credits inform that Yusra's sister Sarah, who had returned to Lesbos as part of voluntary efforts to assist incoming refugees in 2016, had been arrested and faced charges carrying potentially long-term prison sentences, if convicted.

Cast
 Nathalie Issa as Yusra Mardini
 Manal Issa as Sarah Mardini
 Ahmed Malek as Nizar
 Matthias Schweighöfer as Sven
 James Krishna Floyd as Emad
 Ali Suliman as Ezzat Mardini
 Kinda Alloush as Mervat Mardini
 Elmi Rashid Elmi as Bilal
 Nahel Tzegai as Shada

Production
In April 2021, it was announced that Manal Issa and Nathalie Issa had been cast to play real-life sisters Yusra and Sara Mardini in The Swimmers for Working Title Films and Netflix.

Principal photography was suspended five days before the start, due to the COVID-19 pandemic in 2020. Production began in April 2021, and the film was shot in the United Kingdom, Belgium, and Turkey. Filming locations in Turkey include Istanbul and Çeşme. 

In the context of the contemporary refugee crisis, Sally El Hosaini did not just want to present the story of the Mardini sisters and the other refugees. Rather, her intention was to show in a realistic style, what refugees are going through in real life. In an interview about the film, Yusra Mardini said “After the Olympics, I realised that it’s not just my story anymore. I realised that my responsibility is to raise awareness and bring hope to millions of refugees around the world and speak for all of those who do not have a voice.”

Release
The Swimmers had its world premiere at the 2022 Toronto International Film Festival on September 8, 2022, and was released in select cinemas on November 11, 2022, before its streaming release on November 23, 2022, by Netflix.

Reception
On review aggregator Rotten Tomatoes, the film has a score of 81% based on 58 reviews, with an average rating of 6.6/10. The website's consensus reads, "The Swimmers can be heavy-handed and it's arguably too long, but it handles a worthy topic with generally uplifting results." On Metacritic, the film holds a score of 62 out of 100, based on 15 critics, indicating "generally favorable reviews."

Accolades

References

External links
 
 
 

American sports drama films
American biographical drama films
Working Title Films films
Arabic-language Netflix original films
English-language Netflix original films
Films scored by Steven Price
Films with screenplays by Jack Thorne
2020s Arabic-language films
2020s English-language films
Film productions suspended due to the COVID-19 pandemic
Films impacted by the COVID-19 pandemic
British sports drama films
British biographical drama films
Films about Olympic swimming and diving
Films shot in the United Kingdom
Films shot in Belgium
Films shot in Turkey
Films shot in Istanbul
Films shot in İzmir
2020s American films
2020s British films
Films set in Syria
Films set in Turkey
Films set in Istanbul
Films set in İzmir
Films set in Greece
Films set in Berlin
Films set in Rio de Janeiro (city)
Biographical films about sportspeople
Drama films based on actual events
Films set in 2015
Films set in 2016
Swimming films